Kutkabubba is a small Aboriginal community, located 40 km north of Wiluna, Western Australia in the Mid West region, within the Shire of Wiluna.

Native title 
The community is located within the Wiluna (WAD6164/98) native title claim area.

Governance 
The community is managed through its incorporated body, Kutkabubba Aboriginal Corporation (formally Kukabubba Aboriginal Corporation), incorporated under the Corporations (Aboriginal and Torres Strait Islander) Act 2006 on 16 November 1994.

Town planning 
Kutkabubba Layout Plan No.1 has been prepared in accordance with State Planning Policy 3.2 Aboriginal Settlements. Layout Plan No.1 is yet to be endorsed by the community.

Notes

External links
 Office of the Registrar of Indigenous Corporations
 Native Title Claimant application summary

Aboriginal communities in Mid West (Western Australia)